Homer Enrique Martínez Yepez (born 6 October 1997) is a Colombian footballer who plays as a centre-back for Categoría Primera A side Atlético Junior.

Career

Club career
In 2016, Martínez had a spell at Atlético Junior. However, he only reached one game with the first team as a unused substitute, before he returned to Barranquilla. He became a regular player at Barranquilla in the 2017 and 2018 seasons in Categoría Primera B. Due to his good performances, he was invited to a two-week trial by Mexican club C.F. Pachuca in November 2018. However, he returned to Barranquilla without a contract.

After a trial period in January 2019, he returned to Atlético Junior, signing a one-year deal in February 2019. In the summer 2019, he was close to join Rionegro Águilas on loan, but no agreement was finally reached and he then once again returned to Barranquilla. In September 2019 it was also reported, that Cypriot club, Pafos FC, had presented an offer for him.

On 13 January 2020 it was confirmed, that Martínez had joined Atlético Bucaramanga for the 2020 season. At the end of 2020, Martínez signed a deal with his former club Atlético Junior for the 2021 season.

International career
Martínez made his debut for the Colombia national team on 16 January 2022 in a 2–1 home win over Honduras.

References

External links
 

1997 births
Living people
Association football defenders
Colombian footballers
Colombia international footballers
Categoría Primera A players
Categoría Primera B players
Atlético Junior footballers
Barranquilla F.C. footballers
Atlético Bucaramanga footballers
People from Atlántico Department
21st-century Colombian people